Two ships of the Indian Navy have been named INS Cuddalore:

 , a  the former HMS Wennington acquired in 1956 and decommissioned in 1979
 , a  commissioned in 1987 and decommissioned in 2018

Indian Navy ship names